The Aerojet 260 was an experimental solid rocket motor constructed and tested in the mid 1960s by Aerojet for NASA.

History 
In the 1960s the 260 was initially designed to test the feasibility of solid rocket motors for space exploration, including use on the lower stage of the Saturn V. As a result, three 260-inch diameter boosters were constructed. The diameter of the rocket motors made transport by rail impossible, as casings were restricted to a 156-inch diameter. To solve this problem Aerojet constructed a new canal leading to their facility in Florida which allowed for delivery of the boosters by barge. Two tests of the boosters (SL-1 and SL-2) were carried out and were reportedly visible up to 80 miles away. The motor third (SL-3) remains in the test silo to this day.

Specifications

References 

https://ntrs.nasa.gov/api/citations/20000033816/downloads/20000033816.pdf

Solid-fuel rockets
Rocketdyne engines